The 2021 Speedway of Nations (sponsored by Monster Energy) was the fourth FIM Speedway of Nations. The competition consisted of two semi-finals and a final. The final was held on 16 & 17 October 2021 and was won by Great Britain, with Poland taking silver and Denmark bronze.

During the final Poland took a first leg lead of ten points ahead of Great Britain. Britain's multiple world champion Tai Woffinden suffered an injury after crashing heavily and was replaced by Dan Bewley for the second leg. Denmark topped the points table during the second leg but Poland earned an automatic place in the grand final after finishing with the highest total from the two legs. This meant that Denmark and Great Britain would take part in the eliminator as the second and third best teams, which Britain won by 6 points to 3. In the grand final, former world champion Bartosz Zmarzlik came out on top but he was followed home by Robert Lambert and Dan Bewley, giving Britain the title by 5 points to 4. It was their first World team title since 1989.

Russian athletes competed as neutral competitors using the designation MFR (Motorcycle Federation of Russia), as the Court of Arbitration for Sport upheld a ban on Russia competing at World Championships. The ban was implemented by the World Anti-Doping Agency in response to state-sponsored doping program of Russian athletes.

First semi-final
  Daugavpils, Latvia
 17 September

Second semi-final
  Daugavpils, Latvia
 18 September

Final
  National Speedway Stadium, Manchester, England
 16 & 17 October

First Leg

Second Leg

Total

Grand Final Qualifier

Grand Final

References

2021
Speedway of Nations
Speedway of Nations
Speedway of Nations
Speedway of Nations
International sports competitions in Manchester